
This is a list of unmade and unreleased projects by Warner Bros. Animation. Some of these productions were, or still are, in development limbo. The following included animated feature films, short films and TV shows that were made by Warner Bros. Animation or their division Warner Animation Group.

1990s

1992

1994

1995

1996

1998

2000s

2000

2003

2004

2005

2006

2008

2009

2010s

2010

2011

2012

2015

2016

2017

2018

2019

2020s

2021

2022

See also
 Warner Bros. Animation
 Warner Animation Group
 List of Warner Bros. Animation productions
 List of unproduced DC Comics projects

References

Unproduced
Warner Bros. Animation
Unproduced Warner Bros. Animation
Warner Bros. Animation
Unproduced Warner Bros. Animation projects

s